The 1887 FA Cup final was a football match between Aston Villa and West Bromwich Albion at the Kennington Oval. It was the final of the sixteenth staging of the FA Cup which saw 124 teams compete for the final. The final was won by Aston Villa with goals coming from Archie Hunter and Hodgetts to give Aston Villa a 2–0 victory.

Route to the Final 
Aston Villa's route to the final was a turbulent one, smashing Wednesbury Old Athletic 13–0 in the first round, but having to play three replays against Wolverhampton Wanderers. After that, they recovered to make it to the final.

Although West Bromwich Albion didn't have any wins nearly as large as Aston Villa's, their path to the final was less turbulent, constantly defeating teams without much variation.

Aston Villa

West Bromwich Albion

Notes

Background
Aston Villa and West Bromwich Albion had already played each other in the FA Cup once, in 1885. They played out a goalless draw, with West Bromwich winning the replay 3–0. Although the two clubs have a fierce rivalry, this match was well before the rivalry developed and was probably not even a catalyst for the rivalry.

Match

Summary

After defeating the incredibly strong team Preston North End in the semis, West Bromwich began the match as favourites. For forty-five minutes, the Aston Villa defense was besieged. The Albion strikers even attempted to run the goalie over his own goal line. However, the first half ended goalless. In the second half, momentum began to shift Villa's way, as West Brom lost confidence. Finally, Villa broke the deadlock when Archie Hunter fired home, the West Brom goalie not even attempting a save, believing Hunter to be offside. In the final minute, Villa completed the win, with Dennis Hodgetts colliding with West Bromwich Albion goalie Bob Roberts, and poking the ball over the line to make it 2–0

Details

See also
 Aston Villa F.C.–West Bromwich Albion F.C. rivalry

References

1887
1886–87 in English football
Aston Villa F.C. matches
West Bromwich Albion F.C. matches
April 1887 sports events
1887 sports events in London